The 1993 United Kingdom–United States Maritime Delimitation Treaties are two treaties between the United Kingdom and the United States which establish maritime boundary between British territories and American territories in the Caribbean Sea.

Both treaties were signed in London on 5 November 1993. The first treaty delimits the boundary between the British territory of Anguilla and the United States Virgin Islands. It is defined by a straight line connecting two individual coordinate points. The full name of the treaty is Treaty between the Government of the United Kingdom of Great Britain and Northern Ireland and the Government of the United States of America on the Delimitation in the Caribbean of a Maritime Boundary between the US Virgin Islands and Anguilla.

The second treaty delimits the boundary between the British Virgin Islands and the United States Virgin Islands and Puerto Rico. The boundary is a simplified equidistant line that runs in a south–south-east direction until it terminates at the tripoint of Anguilla. The full name of the treaty is Agreement between the Government of the United Kingdom of Great Britain and Northern Ireland and the Government of the United States of America on the Delimitation in the Caribbean of a Maritime Boundary between Puerto Rico/US Virgin Islands and the British Virgin Islands.

The two treaties entered into force on 1 June 1995 after they had been ratified by both states.

Notes

References
 Anderson, Ewan W. (2003). International Boundaries: A Geopolitical Atlas. Routledge: New York. ;  OCLC 54061586
 Charney, Jonathan I., David A. Colson, Robert W. Smith. (2005). International Maritime Boundaries, 5 vols. Hotei Publishing: Leiden. ; ; ; ; ;  OCLC 23254092

External links
 Document with full texts of the treaties and maps
Full text of first treaty (Anguilla – U.S. Virgin Islands)
Full text of second treaty (British Virgin Islands – U.S. Virgin Islands/Puerto Rico)

Maritime Boundary Treaties
Maritime Boundary Treaties
Maritime Boundary Treaties
Boundary treaties
Anguilla–United States Virgin Islands border
British Virgin Islands–Puerto Rico border
British Virgin Islands–United States Virgin Islands border
Treaties concluded in 1993
Treaties entered into force in 1995
United Kingdom–United States treaties
United Nations treaties
Treaties extended to Anguilla
Treaties extended to the British Virgin Islands
Treaties extended to the United States Virgin Islands
Treaties extended to Puerto Rico
November 1993 events in the United Kingdom